is a professional Japanese baseball player. He is a catcher for the Chiba Lotte Marines of Nippon Professional Baseball (NPB).

References 

1998 births
Living people
Baseball people from Fukushima Prefecture
Nippon Professional Baseball catchers
Chiba Lotte Marines players